Kiln House is the fourth studio album by British blues rock band Fleetwood Mac, released on 18 September 1970 by Reprise Records. This is the first album after the departure of founder Peter Green, and their last album to feature guitarist Jeremy Spencer. Christine McVie was present at the recording sessions and contributed backing vocals, keyboards and cover art, although she was not a full member of the band until shortly after the album's completion.

Background
The album title is taken from the name of a converted oast house in Truncheaunts Lane, near Alton in Hampshire. The house was leased by the band, who lived there communally with their families for a six-month period in 1970. Mick Fleetwood married Jenny Boyd at the house on 20 June 1970.

Spencer, who played on only one track during the recording of the previous album, Then Play On, played a much more active role during the Kiln House sessions. His retro 1950s homages and parodies dominate the album, although Danny Kirwan's songs are almost equally prominent. "Buddy's Song" is a cover of a song first recorded by Bobby Vee in 1963, which itself was a partial cover of "Peggy Sue Got Married" with new lyrics listing a number of Buddy Holly song titles. The song is credited to Buddy Holly's mother, who received the writing credit after Buddy's funeral from the original composer, Waylon Jennings.

An early version of Kirwan's instrumental "Earl Gray", entitled "Farewell", was later released on the compilation The Vaudeville Years.

The album reached  69, on the Billboard 200 album chart on 7 November 1970, and No. 67 in Canada's RPM Magazine, December 19, 1970.

Track listing

"Hi Ho Silver" (a.k.a. "Honey Hush") incorrectly credited to Fats Waller and Ed Kirkeby, in confusion with another song (Waller died ten years before this song was written).

"Purple Dancer" is referred to as such only on the 2020 remastered album; on all prior releases it is titled "The Purple Dancer".

Personnel
Fleetwood Mac
Jeremy Spencer – guitar, slide guitar, piano, vocals
Danny Kirwan – guitar, vocals
John McVie – bass guitar
Mick Fleetwood – drums, percussion

Additional personnel
Christine McVie – Wurlitzer 200A, piano, backing vocals (uncredited)

Production
Producer – Fleetwood Mac
Engineer – Martin Birch
Cover drawing – Christine McVie

Charts

References

Fleetwood Mac albums
1970 albums
Reprise Records albums
Albums produced by John McVie
Albums produced by Jeremy Spencer
Albums produced by Danny Kirwan
Albums produced by Mick Fleetwood